The 1965 French Grand Prix was a Formula One motor race held at the Circuit de Charade, Clermont-Ferrand on 27 June 1965. It was race 4 of 10 in both the 1965 World Championship of Drivers and the 1965 International Cup for Formula One Manufacturers.

The 40-lap race was won by Scotland's Jim Clark. Driving the Climax-engined Lotus 25, Clark took pole position, led every lap and set the fastest lap. It was his third win in four races, and his second Grand Slam of the season. Clark's Grand Slam followed his Grand Slam at the South African Grand Prix, making him the first driver to win a Grand Slam in subsequent races since Alberto Ascari. Fellow Scottish driver Jackie Stewart finished second in a BRM, with Englishman John Surtees third in a Ferrari.

Classification

Qualifying

Race

Championship standings after the race

Drivers' Championship standings

Constructors' Championship standings

References

French Grand Prix
French Grand Prix
1965 in French motorsport